Shaili Singh (born 7 January 2004) is an Indian athlete who competes in long jump events. She is the junior Indian national long jump champion in age group categories and ranks among world's top 20 long jumpers in the Under-18 category. She holds the national record for long jump in the Under-18 category. She is trained by veteran Indian long jumper Anju Bobby George and her husband Robert Bobby George.

Personal life and background 
Singh was born on 7 January 2004 in Jhansi, Uttar Pradesh  India. She was raised by mother Vinita Singh, who is a single parent to three children. Vinita Singh is an small time entrepreneur by profession.

Singh moved to Bangalore at the age of 14 to train at the Anju Bobby George Sports Foundation. Singh started training under the supervision of the George couple.

Professional achievements 
Singh won the gold medal in long jump in the U-16 category at the Junior National athletics championship in Ranchi in 2018, where she also broke the national record for junior long jump; she recorded a 5.94-metre jump. In 2019, she bettered her own record in Under-18, jumping 6.15 meters to win the gold medal at the Junior National Athletics competition in Guntur, Andhra Pradesh. This was way ahead of the qualifying mark for participation in the IAAF Under-20 Championship in 2020. India's Minister of Sports Kiren Rijiju tweeted a congratulatory message to her on her success.
In June 2021, at the senior athletic championships (National Inter-state) held in Patiala, Shaili jumped 6.48m, a new U20 record and won the long jump event while still a junior. Shaili Singh registered a jump of 6.59m to clinch the silver medal in long jump at the 2021 World Athletic U20 Championships.

International competitions

Medals 

 Gold medal in Under 16 long jump category at National Junior Athletics Championship Ranchi 2018.
 Gold medal in Under 18 category at National Junior Athletics Championship 2019, Guntur, Andhra Pradesh.
Silver medal in long jump at Under 20 World Athletics Championship Nairobi 2021.
 silver medal in open category at national games 2022 [Gujarat]
 Gold medal in long jump category at National Open Athletics Bangalore October 2022 - First Gold Medal at senior level.

References

External links

2004 births
Living people
People from Jhansi
Athletes from Uttar Pradesh
Indian female long jumpers